One More Time is the first extended play by South Korean boy band Super Junior, released on October 8, 2018, by SM Entertainment. The album is the group's first full Latin pop album, and marks the return of Ryeowok after his mandatory military service. Ahead of the official release, SM Entertainment released the single "Animals". Only seven members participated in the comeback; Leeteuk, Yesung, Shindong, Eunhyuk, Donghae, Siwon and Ryeowook. Heechul declined due to physical health issues, though he still participated in the album's recording. The same day as the release, SuJu held a music video showcase at MGM Theater Macao, on October 8, 2018.

Background and release 
On September 17, 2018, Super Junior released the first teaser for the album, alongside its title track and release date. This was the group's first release since Ryeowook's return from his military service. The album contains five tracks, and features Reik and Leslie Grace. Heechul and Eunhyuk helped in writing the lyrics for "Lo Siento (Play-N-Skillz Remix ver.)". The EP also contains a cover of Luis Miguel's Spanish cover version of Dusty Springfield's "I Only Want to Be with You", "Ahora te puedes marchar".

In July 2018, Heechul announced on a Weibo live video, that he would not participate in the album's activities in order to continue recovery. However, along with the release of his teaser photo, Label SJ announced that Kim Hee-chul would take part in the recording, but not in the albums promotions.

Track listing

Charts

Weekly charts

Year-end charts

Listicles

Personnel
Credits for One More Time is adapted from its linear notes.
Label SJ – executive producer
Tak Young-jun – producer
Lee Min-gyu – recorder
Lee Ji-hong – recorder
Kim Hyun-gon – recorder
Jang Woo-young – recorder
Min Sung-soo – recorder 
Jeong Ki-hong – recorder
Ji Yong-joo – recorder
Hong Sung-jun – recorder 
Kim Kwang-min – recorder
Lee Chang-seon – recorder
by Nam Gung-jin – mixer
Koo Jong-pil (BEAT BURGER) – mixer
Kim Chul-soon – mixer
Lee Min-gyu – mixer
Chris Gehringer – mastering
BIRD – design
Han Jong-cheol – photographer
Park Ji-young – stylist
Yang Hee-jin – stylist 
Kim Hye-yeon – hair stylist
Han Hyo-eun – make-up artist

"One More Time" (ft. Reik and Super Junior version)
Butterfly – vocal director
Joo Chan-yang – background vocals
Andreas Stone Johansson – background vocals
Denniz Jamm – background vocals
Costa Leon – background vocals

"Animals"
Jeon Seong-woo – vocal director, background vocals
Anton Dahlrot – background vocal

"Ahora Te Puedes Marchar"
Butterfly – vocal director 
Hwang Seong-je – background vocals, brass arrangement and conductor
Seo Mi-rae – background vocals
Jung Dong-yoon – drum
Baek Kyung-jin – bass 
Hong Jun-ho – guitar
Lee Ing-wan – brass
Choi Jin-hyun– brass
Choi Jae-moon– brass

Release history

References

External links
 Super Junior official homepage 
 Super Junior official YouTube channel

2018 debut EPs
Super Junior EPs
SM Entertainment EPs